Arnar Freyr Jónsson (born 25 May 1983) is an Icelandic basketball player and a former member of the Icelandic national basketball team. He played 15 seasons in the Úrvalsdeild karla and won the Icelandic championship four times and the Icelandic Basketball Cup three times.

In August 2012, Arnar joined BC Aarhus. On 22 September 2012 he set the Basketligaen single game record for assists when he had 16 for BC Aarhus against Aalborg Vikings.

After his Úrvalsdeildar career ended, Arnar Freyr played for Division II club Njarðvík-b.

National team career
From 2004 to 2006, Arnar played 26 games for the  Icelandic national basketball team.

References

External links
2000–2007 Úrvalsdeild statistics
Icelandic statistics 2008–2015
FIBA Europe profile

1983 births
Living people
Arnar Jónsson
Arnar Jónsson
Arnar Jónsson
Arnar Jónsson
Arnar Jónsson
Point guards
Arnar Jónsson
Arnar Jónsson